Mannosyl-oligosaccharide 1,2-alpha-mannosidase (mannosidase 1A, mannosidase 1B, 1,2-alpha-mannosidase, exo-alpha-1,2-mannanase, mannose-9 processing alpha-mannosidase, glycoprotein processing mannosidase I, mannosidase I, Man9-mannosidase, ManI, 1,2-alpha-mannosyl-oligosaccharide alpha-D-mannohydrolase) is an enzyme with systematic name 2-alpha-mannosyl-oligosaccharide alpha-D-mannohydrolase. This enzyme catalyses the following chemical reaction

 Hydrolysis of the terminal (1->2)-linked alpha-D-mannose residues in the oligo-mannose oligosaccharide Man9(GlcNAc)2

This enzyme is involved in the synthesis of glycoproteins.

Kifunensine is a potent inhibitor of mannosidase I.

References

External links 
 

EC 3.2.1